Sakrigali (also known as Sakrigali Ghat/ Sakribazar/ Sakri) is a village in the Sahibganj CD block in the Sahibganj subdivision of the Sahibganj district in the Indian state of Jharkhand.

Geography

Location

Overview
Rajmahal coalfield is shown in the map. The entire area is overwhelmingly rural with only small pockets of urbanisation. 

Note: The full screen map is interesting. All places marked on the map are linked and you can easily move on to another page of your choice. Enlarge the map to see what else is there – one gets railway links, many more road links and so on.

Demographics
According to the 2011 Census of India, Sakribazar had a total population of 1,199, of which 644 (54%) were males and 555 (46%) were females. Population in the age range 0-6 years was 297. The total number of literate persons in Sakribazar was 601 (66.63% of the population over 6 years).

Transport
Sakrigali railway station is situated on the Sahibganj loop. 

Before the Farakka Barrage across the Ganges was constructed, people going to the Darjeeling Hills or North Bengal from Kolkata, used to travel by  broad gauge train to Sakrigali Ghat and then cross the Ganges by steamer. On the other side of the river at Manihari Ghat, they used to take a metre gauge train to Siliguri. Once Farakka Barrage became operational in 1975 (the barrage has a broad gauge rail line on it), this route became redundant.

Sahibganj Multimodal Port, with a capacity to handle 2.24 million tonnes of cargo annually, is located at Sakrigali.

References

External links

Villages in Sahibganj district